Butestrol, or racemic butestrol (rac-butestrol) is a synthetic nonsteroidal estrogen which was never marketed. It is structurally related to diethylstilbestrol and other stilbestrols.

See also
 meso-Butestrol

References

Abandoned drugs
Phenols
Synthetic estrogens